The R279 road is a regional road in Ireland linking Cliffoney and Mullaghmore in County Sligo. The 19th century Classiebawn Castle is located on this road just before entering Mullaghmore. The entire road is part of the Wild Atlantic Way, which continues around Mullaghmore Head after the end of the R279.

See also
Roads in Ireland

References

Regional roads in the Republic of Ireland
Roads in County Sligo